John Goodman (5 February 1826 – 16 April 1874) was a pastoralist and politician in colonial Victoria, a member of the Victorian Legislative Council and later, the Victorian Legislative Assembly.

Early life
Goodman was born in Warminster, Wiltshire, England, the son of John Goodman and his wife Sarah. Goodman junior arrived in the Port Phillip District in December 1844.

Colonial Australia
In 1853 Goodman was elected to the unicameral Victorian Legislative Council for Loddon a seat he held until the original Council was abolished in March 1856. Goodman was elected to the seat of The Murray in the inaugural Victorian Legislative Assembly in November 1856, a seat he held until he resigned in January 1858. Goodman was Commissioner Trade & Customs from 25 February 1857 to 11 March 1857.

References

 

1828 births
1874 deaths
Members of the Victorian Legislative Assembly
Members of the Victorian Legislative Council
People from Warminster
English emigrants to Australia
Australian pastoralists
19th-century Australian politicians
19th-century Australian businesspeople